Charles Stevens may refer to:
Charles F. Stevens (born 1934), neuroscientist
Charles Stevens (pastor) (1892–1982), founder/President of Piedmont Bible College
Charles A. Stevens (1816–1892), U.S. Representative from Massachusetts
Charles Stevens (whaler), American whaler of the 19th century in Hawaii
Charles Stevens (Australian politician) (1823–1883), New South Wales politician
Charles Stevens (actor) (1893–1964), Apache/Mexican actor
Charles Stevens (wrestler), American Olympic wrestler
Charles Stevens (serial killer) (born 1969), American serial killer
Charles Edward Stevens (1927–2008), American scientist, professor, and veterinarian
Charles Cecil Stevens (1841–1909), British colonial administrator in Bengal
Charles Isaac Stevens (1835–1917), American born clergyman
Chuck Stevens (born 1918), baseball player
C. C. Stevens (1907–1974), British sound engineer
C. A. Stephens (1844–1931), American writer

See also
Charles E. Stevens American Atheist Library and Archives
Charles Stephens (disambiguation)